Don Van Vliet (born Don Glen Vliet; January 15, 1941 – December 17, 2010) was an American singer, songwriter, multi-instrumentalist, and visual artist best known by the stage name Captain Beefheart. Conducting a rotating ensemble known as The Magic Band, he recorded 13 studio albums between 1967 and 1982. His music blended elements of blues, free jazz, rock, and avant-garde composition with idiosyncratic rhythms, absurdist wordplay, a loud, gravelly voice, and his claimed wide vocal range, though reports of it have varied from three octaves to seven and a half. Known for his enigmatic persona, Beefheart frequently constructed myths about his life and was known to exercise an almost dictatorial control over his supporting musicians. Although he achieved little commercial success, he sustained a cult following as an influence on an array of experimental rock and punk-era artists.

A prodigy sculptor in his childhood, Van Vliet developed an eclectic musical taste during his teen years in Lancaster, California, and formed "a mutually useful but volatile" friendship with musician Frank Zappa, with whom he sporadically competed and collaborated. He began performing with his Captain Beefheart persona in 1964 and joined the original Magic Band line-up, initiated by Alexis Snouffer, the same year. The group released their debut album Safe as Milk in 1967 on Buddah Records. After being dropped by two consecutive record labels they signed to Zappa's Straight Records, where they released 1969's Trout Mask Replica; the album would later rank 58th in Rolling Stone magazine's 2003 list of the 500 greatest albums of all time. In 1974, frustrated by a lack of commercial success, he pursued a more conventional rock sound, but the ensuing albums were critically panned; this move, combined with not having been paid for a European tour, and years of enduring Beefheart's abusive behavior, led the entire band to quit.

Beefheart eventually formed a new Magic Band with a group of younger musicians and regained critical approval through three final albums: Shiny Beast (1978), Doc at the Radar Station (1980)  and Ice Cream for Crow (1982). Van Vliet made few public appearances after his retirement from music in 1982. He pursued a career in art, an interest that originated in his childhood talent for sculpture, and a venture which proved to be his most financially secure. His abstract expressionist paintings and drawings command high prices, and have been exhibited in art galleries and museums across the world. Van Vliet died in 2010, having had multiple sclerosis for many years.

Biography

Early life and musical influences, 1941–62
Van Vliet was born Don Glen Vliet in Glendale, California, on January 15, 1941, to Glen Alonzo Vliet, a service station owner of Dutch ancestry from Kansas, and Willie Sue Vliet (née Warfield), who was from Arkansas.  He said that he was descended from Peter van Vliet, a Dutch painter who knew Rembrandt. Van Vliet also said that he was related to adventurer and author Richard Halliburton and cowboy actor Slim Pickens, and he said that he remembered being born.

Van Vliet began painting and sculpting at age three. His subjects reflected his "obsession" with animals, particularly dinosaurs, fish, African mammals and lemurs. At the age of nine, he won a children's sculpting competition organized for the Los Angeles Zoo in Griffith Park by a local tutor, Agostinho Rodrigues. Local newspaper cuttings of his junior sculpting achievements can be found reproduced in the Splinters book, included in the Riding Some Kind of Unusual Skull Sleigh boxed CD work, released in 2004. The sprawling park, with its zoo and observatory, had a strong influence on young Vliet, as it was a short distance from his home on Waverly Drive. The track "Observatory Crest" on Bluejeans & Moonbeams reflects this continued interest. A portrait photo of school-age Vliet can be seen on the front of the lyric sheet within the first issue of the US release of Trout Mask Replica.

For some time during the 1950s, Van Vliet worked as an apprentice with Rodrigues, who considered him a child prodigy. Van Vliet said that he was a lecturer at the Barnsdall Art Institute in Los Angeles at the age of eleven, although it is likely he simply gave a form of artistic dissertation. Accounts of Van Vliet's precocious achievement in art often include his statement that he sculpted on a weekly television show. He said that his parents discouraged his interest in sculpture, based upon their perception of artists as "queer". According to one of Van Vliet's versions of this story, they declined several scholarship offers, including one from the local Knudsen Creamery to travel to Europe with six years' paid tuition to study marble sculpture. Van Vliet was deeply disappointed by their denial of this opportunity for him to realize his potential as an artist. He later claimed that the experience made him so bitter that he never listened to music and abandoned his art until he was twenty-three.

Van Vliet's artistic enthusiasm became so fervent, he said that his parents were forced to feed him through the door in the room where he sculpted. When he was thirteen the family moved from the Los Angeles area to the more remote farming town of Lancaster, in the Mojave Desert, where there was a growing aerospace industry supported by nearby Edwards Air Force Base. It was an environment that would greatly influence him creatively from then on. Van Vliet remained interested in art; several of his paintings, often reminiscent of Franz Kline were later used as front covers for his music albums. Meanwhile, he developed his taste and interest in music, listening "intensively" to the Delta blues of Son House and Robert Johnson, jazz artists such as Ornette Coleman, John Coltrane, Thelonious Monk and Cecil Taylor, and the Chicago blues of Howlin' Wolf and Muddy Waters. During his early teenage years, Vliet would sometimes socialize with members of local bands such as the Omens and the  Blackouts, although his interests were still focused upon an art career. The Omens' guitarists Alexis Snouffer and Jerry Handley would later become founders of "the Magic Band" and the Blackouts' drummer, Frank Zappa, would later capture Vliet's vocal capabilities on record for the first time. This first known recording, when he was simply "Don Vliet", is "Lost In A Whirlpool" – one of Zappa's early "field recordings" made in his college classroom with brother Bobby on guitar. It is featured on Zappa's posthumously released The Lost Episodes (1996).

Van Vliet said that he never attended public school, alleging "half a day of kindergarten" to be the extent of his formal education and saying that "if you want to be a different fish, you've got to jump out of the school". His associates said that he only dropped out during his senior year of high school to help support the family after his father's heart attack. His graduation picture appears in the school's yearbook.  His statements that he never attended school – and his general disavowals of education – may have been related to his experience of dyslexia which, although never officially diagnosed, was obvious to sidemen such as John French and Denny Walley, who observed his difficulty reading cue-cards on stage, and his frequent need to be read aloud to.  While attending Antelope Valley High School in Lancaster, Van Vliet became close friends with fellow teenager Frank Zappa, the pair bonding through their interest in Chicago blues and R&B. Van Vliet is portrayed in both The Real Frank Zappa Book and Barry Miles' biography Zappa as fairly spoiled at this stage of his life, the center of attention as an only child. He spent most of his time locked in his room listening to records, often with Zappa, into the early hours in the morning, eating leftover food from his father's Helms bread truck and demanding that his mother bring him a Pepsi.  His parents tolerated such behavior under the belief that their child was truly gifted. Vliet's "Pepsi-moods" were ever a source of amusement to band members, leading Zappa to later write the wry tune "Why Doesn't Someone Give Him A Pepsi?" that featured on the Bongo Fury tour.

After Zappa began regular occupation at Paul Buff's PAL Studio in Cucamonga he and Van Vliet began collaborating, tentatively as the Soots (pronounced "suits"). By the time Zappa had turned the venue into Studio Z the duo had completed some songs. These were "Cheryl's Canon", "Metal Man Has Won His Wings" and a Howlin' Wolf styled rendition of Little Richard's "Slippin' and Slidin'". Further songs, on Zappa's Mystery Disc (1996), '"I Was a Teen-Age Malt Shop" and "The Birth of Captain Beefheart" also provide an insight to Zappa's "teenage movie" script titled Captain Beefheart vs. the Grunt People, the first appearances of the Beefheart name. It has been suggested this name came from a term used by Vliet's Uncle Alan who had a habit of exposing himself to Don's girlfriend, Laurie Stone. He would urinate with the bathroom door open and, if she was walking by, would mumble about his penis, saying "Ahh, what a beauty! It looks just like a big, fine beef heart".  In a 1970 interview with Rolling Stone, Van Vliet requests "don't ask me why or how" he and Zappa came up with the name. Johnny Carson also asked him the same question to which Van Vliet replied that one day he was standing on the pier and saw fishermen cutting the bills off pelicans. He said it made him sad and put "a beef in his heart". Carson appeared nervous and uncomfortable interviewing Van Vliet and after the next commercial break Van Vliet was gone. He would later say in an appearance on Late Night with David Letterman that the name referred to "a beef in my heart against this society". In the "Grunt People" draft script Beefheart and his mother play themselves, with his father played by Howlin' Wolf. Grace Slick is penned in as a "celestial seductress" and there are also roles for future Magic Band members Bill Harkleroad and Mark Boston.

Van Vliet enrolled at Antelope Valley College as an art major, but decided to leave the following year. He once worked as a door-to-door vacuum cleaner salesman, and sold a vacuum cleaner to the writer Aldous Huxley at his home in Llano, pointing to it and declaring, "Well I assure you sir, this thing sucks." After managing a Kinney's shoe store, Van Vliet relocated to Rancho Cucamonga, California, to reconnect with Zappa, who inspired his entry into musical performance. Van Vliet was quite shy but was eventually able to imitate the deep voice of Howlin' Wolf with his wide vocal range. He eventually grew comfortable with public performance and, after learning to play the harmonica, began playing at dances and small clubs in Southern California.

Initial recordings, 1962–69
In early 1965 Alex Snouffer, a Lancaster rhythm and blues guitarist, invited Vliet to sing with a group that he was assembling. Vliet joined the first Magic Band and changed his name to Don Van Vliet, while Snouffer became Alex St. Clair (sometimes spelled Claire). Captain Beefheart and his Magic Band signed to A&M and released two singles in 1966. The first was a version of Bo Diddley's "Diddy Wah Diddy" that became a regional hit in Los Angeles. The followup, "Moonchild" (written by David Gates, later of the band Bread) was less well received. That year the band began to play some larger west coast venues, such as the Avalon Ballroom in San Francisco.

Safe as Milk
After fulfilling their deal for two singles the band presented demos to A&M during 1966 for what would become the Safe as Milk album. A&M's Jerry Moss reportedly described this new direction as "too negative" and dropped the band from the label, although still under contract. Much of the demo recording was accomplished at Art Laboe's Original Sound Studio, then with Gary Marker on the controls at Sunset Sound on 8-track. By the end of 1966 they were signed to Buddah Records and much of the demo work was transferred to 4-track, at the behest of Krasnow and Perry, in the RCA Studio in Hollywood, where the recording was finalized. Tracks that were originally laid down in the demo by Doug Moon are therefore taken up by Ry Cooder's work in the release, as Moon had departed over "musical differences" at this juncture.

Drummer John French had now joined the group and it would later (notably on Trout Mask Replica) be his patience that was required to transcribe Van Vliet's creative ideas (often expressed by whistling or banging on the piano) into musical form for the other group members. On French's departure this role was taken over by Bill Harkleroad for Lick My Decals Off, Baby.

Many of the lyrics on the Safe as Milk album were written by Van Vliet in collaboration with the writer Herb Bermann, who befriended Van Vliet after seeing him perform at a bar-gig in Lancaster in 1966. The song "Electricity" was a poem written by Bermann, who gave Van Vliet permission to adapt it to music.  Unlike the album's mostly blues rock sound, songs such as "Electricity" illustrated the band's unconventional instrumentation and Van Vliet's unusual vocals, which guitarist Doug Moon described as "hinting of things to come".

Much of the Safe as Milk material was honed and arranged by the arrival of 20-year–old guitar prodigy Ry Cooder, who had been brought into the group after much pressure from Vliet. The band began recording in spring 1967, with Richard Perry cutting his teeth in his first job as producer. The album was released in September 1967. Richie Unterberger of Allmusic called the album "blues–rock gone slightly askew, with jagged, fractured rhythms, soulful, twisting vocals from Van Vliet, and more doo wop, soul, straight blues, and folk–rock influences than he would employ on his more avant garde outings".

John Lennon displayed two of the album's promotional "baby bumper stickers" in the sunroom at his home. The Beatles planned to sign Beefheart to their experimental Zapple label (plans that were scrapped after Allen Klein took over the group's management). Vliet claimed to have met Paul McCartney in a Cannes hotel nightclub during their tour of Europe on January 27, 1968, urinated together on a statue outside the hotel at the prodding of journalists and photographers, and participated in a jam session together with McCartney and Penny Nichols. Producer attempts to convince McCartney to switch labels to Kama Sutra obstructed the possibility of a pleasant evening. McCartney later said he had no recollection of this meeting.

Van Vliet was often critical of the Beatles, however. He considered the lyric "I'd love to turn you on" from their song "A Day in the Life" to be ridiculous and conceited. Tiring of their "lullabies", he lampooned them with the Strictly Personal song "Beatle Bones 'n' Smokin' Stones", that featured the sardonic refrain of "strawberry fields, all the winged eels slither on the heels of today's children, strawberry fields forever". Vliet spoke badly of Lennon after getting no response when he sent a telegram of support to him and wife Yoko Ono during their 1969 "Bed-In for peace".

The flipside of success
Doug Moon left the band because of his dislike of the band's increasing experimentation outside his preferred blues genre. Ry Cooder told of Moon's becoming so angered by Van Vliet's unrelenting criticism that he walked into the room pointing a loaded crossbow at him, only to have Van Vliet tell him, "Get that fucking thing out of here, get out of here and get back in your room", which he did. (Other band members dispute this account, though Moon is likely to have "passed through" the studio with a weapon.) Moon was present during the early demo sessions at Original Sound studio, above the Kama Sutra/Buddah offices. The works Moon laid down did not see the light of day, as he was replaced by Cooder when they continued on material at Sunset Sound with Marker. Marker then fell by the wayside when recording was moved by Krasnow and Perry to RCA Studio. This would have a profound effect on the quality of the Safe as Milk work, as the former studio was 8-track and the subsequent studio a 4-track.

To support the album's release the group had been scheduled to play at the 1967 Monterey Pop Festival. During this period, Vliet had severe anxiety attacks that made him convinced that he was having a heart attack, possibly exacerbated by his heavy LSD use and the fact that his father had died of heart failure a few years earlier. At a vital "warm-up" performance at the Fantasy Fair and Magic Mountain Music Festival (June 10–11) shortly before the scheduled Monterey Festival (June 16–18), the band began to play "Electricity" and Van Vliet froze, straightened his tie, then walked off the  stage and landed on manager Bob Krasnow. He later claimed he had seen a girl in the audience turn into a fish, with bubbles coming from her mouth. This aborted any opportunity of breakthrough success at Monterey, as Cooder immediately decided he could no longer work with Van Vliet, effectively quitting both the event and the band on the spot. With such complex guitar parts there was no means for the band to find a competent replacement in time for Monterey. Cooder's spot was eventually filled for a short spell by Gerry McGee, who had played with the Monkees. According to French the band did two gigs with McGee, one of which was at The Peppermint Twist near Long Beach. The other was at Santa Monica Civic Auditorium, August 7, 1967, as opening act for the Yardbirds. McGee was in the group long enough to have an outfit made by a Santa Monica boutique that also created the gear worn by the band on the Strictly Personal cover stamps.

Strictly Personal
In August 1967, guitarist Jeff Cotton filled the guitar spot vacated, in turn, by Cooder and McGee. In October and November 1967 the Snouffer/Cotton/Handley/French line–up recorded material for what was planned to be the second album. Originally intended to be a double album called It Comes to You in a Plain Brown Wrapper for the  label, it was released later in pieces in 1971 and 1995. After rejection from Buddah, Bob Krasnow encouraged the band to re-record four of the shorter numbers, add two more, and make shorter versions of "Mirror Man" and "Kandy Korn". Krasnow created a strange mix full of "phasing" that, by most accounts (including Beefheart's), diminished the music's strength. This was released in October 1968 as Strictly Personal on Krasnow's Blue Thumb label. Stewart Mason in his Allmusic review of the album described it as a "terrific album" and a "fascinating, underrated release ... every bit the equal of Safe as Milk and Trout Mask Replica". Langdon Winner of Rolling Stone called Strictly Personal "an excellent album. The guitars of the Magic Band mercilessly bend and stretch notes in a way that suggests that the world of music has wobbled clear off its axis", with the lyrics demonstrating "Beefheart's ability to juxtapose delightful humor with frightening insights".

Mirror Man
In 1971 some of the recordings done for Buddah were released as Mirror Man, bearing a liner note stating that the material had been recorded in "one night in Los Angeles in 1965". This was a ruse to circumvent possible copyright issues. The material was recorded in November and December 1967. Essentially a "jam" album, described as pushing "the boundaries of conventional blues–rock, with a Beefheart vocal tossed in here and there. Some may miss Beefheart's surreal poetry, gruff vocals, and/or free jazz influence, while others may find it fascinating to hear the Magic Band simply letting go and cutting loose." The album's "miss-credit errors" also state band members as "Alex St. Clare Snouffer" (Alex St. Clare/Alexis Snouffer), "Antennae Jimmy Simmons" (Semens/Jeff Cotton) and "Jerry Handsley" (Handley). First vinyl was issued in both a die-cut gatefold (revealing a "cracked" mirror) and a single sleeve with same image. The UK Buddah issue was part of the Polydor-manufactured "Select" series.

During his first trip to England in January 1968, Captain Beefheart was briefly represented in the UK by mod icon Peter Meaden, an early manager of the Who. The Captain and his band members were initially denied entry to the United Kingdom, because Meaden had illegally booked them for gigs without applying for appropriate work permits. After returning to Germany for a few days, press coverage and public outcry resulted in the band being permitted to re-enter the UK, where they recorded material for John Peel's radio show and on Friday January 19 appeared at the Middle Earth venue, introduced by Peel, where they played tracks from Safe as Milk and some of the experimental blues tracks from Mirror Man. The band was met by an enthusiastic audience; French recalled the event as a rare high moment for the band: "After the show, we were taken to the dressing room where we sat for hours as a line of what seemed like hundreds of people walked in one by one to shake our hand or get an autograph. Many brought imports of Safe as Milk with them for us to autograph ... It seemed like we had finally gained some reward ... Suddenly all the criticizing and intimidation and eccentricities seemed very unimportant. It was a glorious moment, one of the very few I ever experienced". By this time, they had terminated their association with Meaden. On January 27, 1968, Beefheart performed in the MIDEM Music Festival on the beach at Cannes, France.

Alex St. Claire left the band in June 1968 after their return from a second European tour and was replaced by teenager Bill Harkleroad; bassist Jerry Handley left a few weeks later.

The 'Brown Wrapper' Sessions
After their Euro tour and the Cannes beach performance the band returned to the US. Moves were already in the air for them to leave Buddah and sign to MGM and, prior to their May tour – mainly in the UK – they re-recorded some Buddah material of the partial Mirror Man sessions at Sunset Sound with Bruce Botnick. Beefheart had also been conceptualizing new band names, including 25th Century Quaker and Blue Thumb, while making suggestions to other musicians that they might get involved. The thought-process of 25th Century Quaker was that it would be a "blues band" alias for the more avant-garde work of the Magic Band. Photographer Guy Webster photographed the band in Quaker-style outfits, and the picture appears in The Mirror Man Sessions CD insert. It would later transpire that much of this situation was transient and that Buddah's Bob Krasnow was to set up his own label. The label that was unsurprisingly named Blue Thumb launched with its first release Strictly Personal, a truncated version of the original Beefheart vision of a double album. Thus "25th Century Quaker" became a track and a potential band-name became a label.

In overview, the works for the double album in this period were intended to be packaged in a plain brown wrapper, with a "strictly personal" over-stamp and addressed in a manner that could have connotations of drug content, pornographic or illicit material; as per the small ads of the time: "It comes to you in a plain brown wrapper." Given that Krasnow had effectively poached the band from Buddah there were limitations on what material could be released. Strictly Personal was the result, contained in its enigmatically addressed parcel sleeve. The raft of material left behind eventually emerged, firstly on CD as I May Be Hungry, But I Sure Ain't Weird and later on vinyl, implemented by John French, as It Comes To You in a Plain Brown Wrapper (which has two tracks that are missing from the former release). Both Blue Thumb and the stamps on the cover of Strictly Personal have LSD connotations, as does the track "Ah Feel Like Ahcid", although Beefheart himself refuted this (claiming that this is a rendering of "I feel like I said").

Trout Mask Replica, 1969

Critically acclaimed as Van Vliet's magnum opus, Trout Mask Replica was released as a 28-track double album in June 1969 on Frank Zappa's newly formed Straight Records label. First issues, in the US, were auto-coupled and housed in the black "Straight" liners along with a 6-page lyric sheet illustrated by the Mascara Snake. A school-age portrait of Van Vliet appears on the front of this sheet, while the cover of the gatefold  shows Beefheart in a modified Pilgrim hat, obscuring his face with the head of a fish. The fish is a carp – arguably a "replica" for a trout, photographed by Cal Schenkel. The inner spread "infra-red" photography is by Ed Caraeff, whose Beefheart vacuum cleaner images from this session also appear on Zappa's Hot Rats release (a month earlier) to accompany "Willie The Pimp" lyrics sung by Vliet. Alex St. Clair had now left the band and, after Junior Madeo from the Blackouts was considered, the role was filled by Bill Harkleroad. Bassist Jerry Handley had also departed, with Gary Marker stepping in. Thus the long rehearsals for the album began in the house on Ensenada Drive in Woodland Hills, L.A. that would become the Magic Band House.

The Magic Band began recordings for Trout Mask Replica with bassist Gary "Magic" Marker at T.T.G. (on "Moonlight on Vermont" and "Veteran's Day Poppy"), but later enlisted bassist Mark Boston after his departure. The remainder of the album was recorded at Whitney Studios, with some field recordings made at the house. Boston was acquainted with French and Harkleroad via past bands. Van Vliet had also begun assigning nicknames to his band members, so Harkleroad became Zoot Horn Rollo, and Boston became Rockette Morton, while John French assumed the name Drumbo, and Jeff Cotton became Antennae Jimmy Semens. Van Vliet's cousin Victor Hayden, the Mascara Snake, performed as a bass clarinetist later in the proceedings. Vliet's girlfriend Laurie Stone, who can be heard laughing at the beginning of "Fallin' Ditch", became an audio typist at the Magic Band house.

Van Vliet wanted the whole band to "live" the Trout Mask Replica album. The group rehearsed Van Vliet's difficult compositions for eight months, living communally in their small rented house in the Woodland Hills suburb of Los Angeles. With only two bedrooms in the house, band members would find sleep in various corners of one, while Vliet occupied the other, and rehearsals were accomplished in the main living area. Van Vliet implemented his vision by completely dominating his musicians, artistically and emotionally. At various times, one or another of the group members was "put in the barrel", with Van Vliet berating him continually, sometimes for days, until the musician collapsed in tears or in total submission. Guitarist Bill Harkleroad complained that his fingers were a "bloody mess" as a result of Beefheart's orders that he use heavy strings. Drummer John French described the situation as "cultlike" and a visiting friend said "the environment in that house was positively Mansonesque". Their material circumstances were dire. With no income other than welfare and contributions from relatives, the group barely survived and were even arrested for shoplifting food (Zappa bailed them out). French has recalled living on no more than a small cup of beans a day for a month. A visitor described their appearance as "cadaverous" and said that "they all looked in poor health". Band members were restricted from leaving the house and practiced for 14 or more hours a day.

John French's 2010 book Through the Eyes of Magic describes some of the "talks", which were initiated by his doing such things as playing a Frank Zappa drum part ("The Blimp (mousetrapreplica)") in his drumming shed and not having finished drum parts as quickly as Beefheart wanted. French writes of being punched by band members, thrown into walls, kicked, punched in the face by Beefheart hard enough to draw blood, being attacked with a sharp broomstick. Eventually Beefheart, French says, threatened to throw him out an upper floor window. He admits complicity in similarly attacking his bandmates during "talks" aimed at them. In the end, after the album's recording, Beefheart ejected French from the band by throwing him down a set of stairs, telling him to "Take a walk, man" after not responding in a desired manner to a request to "play a strawberry" on the drums. Beefheart replaced French with drummer Jeff Bruschel, an acquaintance of Hayden. Referred to as "Fake Drumbo" (playing on French's drumset) this final act resulted in French's name not appearing on the album credits, either as a player or arranger. Bruschel toured with the band to Europe but was replaced by the next recording.

According to Van Vliet, the 28 songs on the album were written in a single -hour session at the piano, an instrument he had no skill in playing, an approach Mike Barnes compared to John Cage's "maverick irreverence toward classical tradition", though band members have stated that the songs were written over the course of about a year, beginning around December 1967. (The band did watch Federico Fellini's 1963 film 8½ during the creation of the album). It took the band about eight months to mold the songs into shape, with French bearing primary responsibility for transposing and shaping Vliet's piano fragments into guitar and bass lines, which were mostly notated on paper. Harkleroad in 1998 said in retrospect: "We're dealing with a strange person, coming from a place of being a sculptor/painter, using music as his idiom. He was getting more into that part of who he was instead of this blues singer. The band had rehearsed the songs so thoroughly that the instrumental tracks for 21 of the songs were recorded in a single four-and-a-half-hour recording session. Van Vliet spent the next few days overdubbing the vocals. The album's cover artwork was photographed and designed by Cal Schenkel and shows Van Vliet wearing the raw head of a carp, bought from a local fish market and fashioned into a mask by Schenkel.

Trout Mask Replica incorporated a wide variety of musical styles, including blues, avant garde/experimental, and rock. The relentless practice prior to recording blended the music into an iconoclastic whole of contrapuntal tempos, featuring slide guitar, polyrhythmic drumming (with French's drums and cymbals covered in cardboard), honking saxophone and bass clarinet. Van Vliet's vocals range from his signature Howlin' Wolf-inspired growl to frenzied falsetto to laconic, casual ramblings.

The instrumental backing was effectively recorded live in the studio, while Van Vliet overdubbed most of the vocals in only partial sync with the music by hearing the slight sound leakage through the studio window. Zappa said of Van Vliet's approach, "[it was] impossible to tell him why things should be such and such a way. It seemed to me that if he was going to create a unique object, that the best thing for me to do was to keep my mouth shut as much as possible and just let him do whatever he wanted to do whether I thought it was wrong or not."

Van Vliet used the ensuing publicity, particularly with a 1970 Rolling Stone interview with Langdon Winner, to promulgate a number of myths that were subsequently quoted as fact. Winner's article stated, for instance, that neither Van Vliet nor the members of the Magic Band ever took drugs, but Harkleroad later contradicted this. Van Vliet claimed to have taught both Harkleroad and Boston to play their instruments from scratch; in fact, the pair were already accomplished young musicians before joining the band. Lastly, Van Vliet claimed to have gone a year and half without sleeping. When asked how this was possible, he claimed to have only eaten fruit.

Critic Steve Huey of AllMusic writes that the album's influence "was felt more in spirit than in direct copycatting, as a catalyst rather than a literal musical starting point. However, its inspiring reimagining of what was possible in a rock context laid the groundwork for countless experiments in rock surrealism to follow, especially during the punk and new wave era." In 2003, the album was ranked sixtieth by Rolling Stone in their list of The 500 Greatest Albums of All Time: "On first listen, Trout Mask Replica sounds like raw Delta blues", with Beefheart "singing and ranting and reciting poetry over fractured guitar licks. But the seeming sonic chaos is an illusion—to construct the songs, the Magic Band rehearsed twelve hours a day for months on end in a house with the windows blacked out. (Producer Frank Zappa was then able to record most of the album in less than five hours.) Tracks such as 'Ella Guru' and 'My Human Gets Me Blues' are the direct predecessors of modern musical primitives such as Tom Waits and PJ Harvey." Guitarist Fred Frith noted that during this process "forces that usually emerge in improvisation are harnessed and made constant, repeatable".

Critic Robert Christgau gave the album a B+, saying, "I find it impossible to give this record an A because it is just too weird. But I'd like to. Very great played at high volume when you're feeling shitty, because you'll never feel as shitty as this record." BBC disc jockey John Peel said of the album: "If there has been anything in the history of popular music which could be described as a work of art in a way that people who are involved in other areas of art would understand, then Trout Mask Replica is probably that work." It was inducted into the United States National Recording Registry in 2011.

Later recordings, 1970–82

Lick My Decals Off, Baby
Lick My Decals Off, Baby (1970) continued in a similarly experimental vein. An album with "a very coherent structure" in the Magic Band's "most experimental and visionary stage", it was Van Vliet's most commercially successful in the United Kingdom, spending twenty weeks on the UK Albums Chart and peaking at number 20. An early promotional music video was made of its title song, and a bizarre television commercial was also filmed that included excerpts from "Woe-Is-uh-Me-Bop", silent footage of masked Magic Band members using kitchen utensils as musical instruments, and Beefheart kicking over a bowl of what appears to be porridge onto a dividing stripe in the middle of a road. The video was rarely played but was accepted into the Museum of Modern Art, where it has been used in several programs related to music.

On this LP Art Tripp III, formerly of the Mothers of Invention, played drums and marimba, along with a returning John French. Lick My Decals Off, Baby was the first record on which the band was credited as "The" Magic Band, rather than "His" Magic Band. Journalist Irwin Chusid interprets this change as "a grudging concession of its members' at least semiautonomous humanity". Robert Christgau gave the album an A−, commenting, "Beefheart's famous five-octave range and covert totalitarian structures have taken on a playful undertone, repulsive and engrossing and slapstick funny." Due to licensing disputes, Lick My Decals Off, Baby was unavailable on CD for many years, though it remained in print on vinyl. It was ranked second in Uncut magazine's May 2010 list of The 50 Greatest Lost Albums. In 2011, the album became available for download on the iTunes Store.

He toured in 1970 with Ry Cooder on the bill to promote the album.

The Spotlight Kid and Clear Spot

The next two records, The Spotlight Kid (simply credited to "Captain Beefheart") and Clear Spot (credited to "Captain Beefheart and the Magic Band"), were both released in 1972. The atmosphere of The Spotlight Kid is, according to one critic, "definitely relaxed and fun, maybe one step up from a jam". And though "things do sound maybe just a little too blasé", "Beefheart at his worst still has something more than most groups at their best." The music is simpler and slower than on the group's two previous releases, the uncompromisingly original Trout Mask Replica and the frenetic Lick My Decals Off, Baby. This was in part an attempt by Van Vliet to become a more appealing commercial proposition as the band had made virtually no money during the previous two years—at the time of recording, the band members were subsisting on welfare food handouts and remittances from their parents. Van Vliet offered that he "got tired of scaring people with what I was doing ... I realized that I had to give them something to hang their hat on, so I started working more of a beat into the music. It's more human that way". Magic Band members have also said that the slower performances were due in part to Van Vliet's inability to fit his lyrics with the instrumental backing of the faster material on the earlier albums, a problem that was exacerbated in that he almost never rehearsed with the group. In the period leading up to the recording the band lived communally, first at a compound near Ben Lomond, California and then in northern California near Trinidad. The situation saw a return to the physical violence and psychological manipulation that had taken place during the band's previous communal residence while composing and rehearsing Trout Mask Replica. According to John French, the worst of this was directed toward Harkleroad. In his autobiography Harkleroad recalls being thrown into a dumpster, an act he interpreted as having metaphorical intent.

Clear Spot production credit of Ted Templeman made AllMusic consider "why in the world [it] wasn't more of a commercial success than it was", and that while fans "of the fully all-out side of Beefheart might find the end result not fully up to snuff as a result, but those less concerned with pushing back all borders all the time will enjoy his unexpected blend of everything tempered with a new accessibility". The review called the song "Big Eyed Beans from Venus" "a fantastically strange piece of aggression". A Clear Spot song, "Her Eyes Are A Blue Million Miles", appeared on the soundtrack of the Coen brothers' cult comedy film The Big Lebowski (1998).

Unconditionally Guaranteed and Bluejeans & Moonbeams
In 1974, immediately after the recording of Unconditionally Guaranteed, which markedly continued the trend towards a more commercial sound heard on some of the Clear Spot tracks, the Magic Band's original members departed. Disgruntled and past members worked together for a period, gigging at Blue Lake and putting together their own ideas and demos, with John French earmarked as the vocalist. These concepts eventually coalesced around the core of Art Tripp III, Harkleroad and Boston, with the formation of Mallard, helped by finance and UK recording facilities from Jethro Tull's Ian Anderson. Some of French's compositions were used in the band's work, but the group's singer was Sam Galpin and the role of keyboardist was eventually taken by John Thomas, who had shared a house with French in Eureka at the time. At this time Vliet attempted to recruit both French and Harkleroad as producers for his next album, but his pleas fell on deaf ears. Andy Di Martino produced both of these Virgin label albums.

Vliet was forced to quickly form a new Magic Band to complete support-tour dates, with studio musicians who had no experience with his music and in fact had never heard it. Having no knowledge of the previous Magic Band style, they simply improvised what they thought would go with each song, playing much slicker versions that have been described as "bar band" versions of Beefheart songs. A review described this incarnation of the Magic Band as the "Tragic Band", a term that has stuck over the years. 
 Robert 'Fuzzy' Fuscaldo – guitar
 Dean Smith – guitar
 Del Simmons – saxophone; flute
 Michael 'Bucky' Smotherman – keyboards; vocals
 Paul Uhrig – bass
 Ty Grimes – drums
Mike Barnes said that the description of the new band "grooving along pleasantly", was "...an appropriately banal description of the music of a man who only a few years ago had composed with the express intent of shaking listeners out of their torpor." The one album they recorded, Bluejeans & Moonbeams (1974) has, like its predecessor, a completely different, almost soft rock sound from any other Beefheart record. Neither was well received; drummer Art Tripp recalled that when he and the original Magic Band listened to Unconditionally Guaranteed, they "...were horrified. As we listened, it was as though each song was worse than the one which preceded it". Beefheart later disowned both albums, calling them "horrible and vulgar", asking that they not be considered part of his musical output and urging fans who bought them to "take copies back for a refund".

Bongo Fury to Bat Chain Puller

By the fall of 1975 the band had completed their European tour, with further US dates in the New Year of 1976, supporting Zappa along with Dr. John. Van Vliet now found himself stuck in a web of contractual hang-ups. At this point Zappa had begun to extend a helping hand, with Vliet already having performed incognito as "Rollin' Red" on Zappa's One Size Fits All (1975) and then joining with him on the Bongo Fury album and its later support tour. Two Vliet-penned numbers on the Bongo Fury album are "Sam with the Showing Scalp Flat Top" and "Man with the Woman Head". The form, texture and imagery of this album's first track, "Debra Kadabra", sung by Vliet, has 'angular similarities' to the work he would later produce in his next three albums. On the Bongo Fury album Vliet also sings "Poofter's Froth Wyoming Plans Ahead", harmonizes on "200 Years Old" and "Muffin Man", and plays harmonica and soprano saxophone.

In early 1976 Zappa put on his producer hat and, once again, opened up his studio facilities and finance to Vliet. This was for the production of an album provisionally titled Bat Chain Puller. The band were John French (drums), John Thomas (keyboards) and Jeff Moris Tepper and Denny Walley (guitars). Much of the work on this album had been finalized and some demos had been circulated when fate once again struck the Beefheart camp. In May 1976 the long association between Zappa and his manager/business partner Herb Cohen ceased. This resulted in Zappa's finances and ongoing works becoming part of protracted legal negotiations. The Bat Chain Puller project went "on ice" and did not see an official release until 2012. After this recording John Thomas joined ex-Magic Band members in Mallard.

Prior to his next album Beefheart appeared in 1977 on the Tubes' album Now, playing saxophone on the song "Cathy's Clone", and the album also featured a cover of the Clear Spot song "My Head Is My Only House Unless It Rains". In 1978 he appeared on Jack Nitzsche's soundtrack to the film Blue Collar.

Shiny Beast (Bat Chain Puller)
Having extricated himself from a mire of contractual difficulties Beefheart emerged with this new album, in 1978, on the Warner Bros label. Shiny Beast (Bat Chain Puller) contained re-workings of the shelved Bat Chain Puller album and still retained its original guitarist, Jeff Moris Tepper. However, he and Vliet were now joined by a whole new line-up of Richard Redus (guitar, bass and accordion), Eric Drew Feldman (bass, piano and synthesizer), Bruce Lambourne Fowler (trombone and air bass), Art Tripp (percussion and marimba) and Robert Arthur Williams (drums). The album was co-produced by Vliet with Pete Johnson. Members of this Magic Band and the "Bat Chain" elements would later feature on Beefheart's last two albums.

Shiny Beast (Bat Chain Puller) was described by Ned Raggett of Allmusic to be "...manna from heaven for those feeling Beefheart had lost his way on his two Mercury albums". Following Vliet's death, John French claimed the 40-second spoken word track "Apes-Ma" to be an analogy of Van Vliet's deteriorating physical condition. The album's sleeve features Van Vliet's 1976 painting Green Tom, one of the many works that would mark out his longed-for career as a painter of note.

Doc at the Radar Station

Doc at the Radar Station (1980) helped establish Beefheart's late resurgence. Released by Virgin Records during the post-punk scene, the music was now accessible to a younger, more receptive audience. He was interviewed in a feature report on KABC-TV's Channel 7 Eyewitness News in which he was hailed as "the father of the new wave. One of the most important American composers of the last fifty years, [and] a primitive genius"; Van Vliet said at this period, "I'm doing a non-hypnotic music to break up the catatonic state ... and I think there is one right now." Huey of Allmusic cited the Doc at the Radar Station as being "...generally acclaimed as the strongest album of his comeback, and by some as his best since Trout Mask Replica", "even if the Captain's voice isn't quite what it once was, Doc at the Radar Station is an excellent, focused consolidation of Beefheart's past and then-present". Van Vliet's biographer Mike Barnes writes of "revamping work built on skeletal ideas and fragments that would have mouldered away in the vaults had they not been exhumed and transformed into full-blown, totally convincing new material". During this period, Van Vliet made two appearances on David Letterman's late night television program on NBC, and also performed on Saturday Night Live.

Richard Redus and Art Tripp departed on this album, with slide guitar and marimba duties taken up by the reappearance of John French. The guitar skills of Gary Lucas also feature on the track "Flavor Bud Living".

Ice Cream for Crow

The final Beefheart record, Ice Cream for Crow (1982), was recorded with Gary Lucas (who was also Van Vliet's manager), Jeff Moris Tepper, Richard Snyder and Cliff Martinez. This line-up made a video to promote the title track, directed by Van Vliet and Ken Schreiber, with cinematography by Daniel Pearl, which was rejected by MTV for being "too weird". However, the video was included in the Letterman broadcast on NBC-TV, and was also accepted into the Museum of Modern Art. Van Vliet announced "I don't want my MTV if they don't want my video" during his interview with Letterman, in reference to MTV's "I want my MTV" marketing campaign of the time. Ice Cream for Crow, along with songs such as its title track, features instrumental performances by the Magic Band with performance poetry readings by Van Vliet. Raggett of AllMusic called the album a "last entertaining blast of wigginess from one of the few truly independent artists in late 20th century pop music, with humor, skill, and style all still intact", with the Magic Band "turning out more choppy rhythms, unexpected guitar lines, and outré arrangements, Captain Beefheart lets everything run wild as always, with successful results". Barnes writes that, "The most original and vital tracks (on the album) are the newer ones", and that it "feels like an hors-d'oeuvre for a main course that never came". Michael Galucci of Goldmine praised the album, describing it as "the single, most bizarre entry in Van Vliet's long, odd career." Promotional work proposed to Beefheart by Virgin Records was as unorthodox as him making an appearance in the 1987 film Grizzly II: The Predator. Soon after, Van Vliet retired from music and began a new career as a painter. Gary Lucas tried to convince him to record one more album, but to no avail.

Riding Some Kind of Unusual Skull Sleigh
Released in 2004 by Rhino Handmade in a limited edition of 1,500 copies, this signed and numbered box set contains a "Riding Some Kind of Unusual Skull Sleigh" CD of Vliet-recited poetry, the Anton Corbijn film of Vliet Some YoYo Stuff on DVD and two art books. One book, entitled Splinters, gives a visual "scrapbook" insight into Vliet's life, from an early age to his painting in retirement. The second, eponymously titled, book is packed with art pages of Vliet's work. The first is bound in green linen, the second in yellow. These colors are counterpointed throughout the package, which comes in a green slipcase measuring 235 mm × 325 mm × 70 mm. An onion-skin wallet, nestling at the package's inner sanctum, contains a matching-numbered Vliet lithograph on hand-rolled paper, signed by the artist. The two books are by publishers Artist Ink Editions.

Paintings
Throughout his musical career, Van Vliet remained interested in visual art. He placed his paintings, often reminiscent of Franz Kline, on several of his albums. In 1987, Van Vliet published Skeleton Breath, Scorpion Blush, a collection of his poetry, paintings and drawings.

In the mid-1980s, Van Vliet became reclusive and abandoned music, stating he had gotten "too good at the horn" and could make far more money painting. Beefheart's first exhibition had been at Liverpool's Bluecoat Gallery during the Magic Band's 1972 tour of the UK. He was interviewed on Granada regional television standing in front of his bold black and white canvases. He was inspired to begin an art career when a fan, Julian Schnabel, who admired the artwork seen on his album covers, asked to buy a drawing from him. His debut exhibition as a serious painter was at the Mary Boone Gallery in New York in 1985 and was initially regarded as that of "another rock musician dabbling in art for ego's sake", though his primitive, non-conformist work has received more sympathetic and serious attention since then, with some sales approaching $25,000. Two books have been published specifically devoted to critique and analysis of his artwork: Riding Some Kind of Unusual Skull Sleigh: On The Arts Of Don Van Vliet (1999) by W. C. Bamberger and Stand Up To Be Discontinued, first published in 1993, a now rare collection of essays on Van Vliet's work. The limited edition version of the book contains a CD of Van Vliet reading six of his poems: Fallin' Ditch, The Tired Plain, Skeleton Makes Good, Safe Sex Drill, Tulip and Gill. A deluxe edition was published in 1994; only 60 were printed, with etchings of Van Vliet's signature, costing £180.

In the early 1980s Van Vliet established an association with the Galerie Michael Werner in Cologne. Eric Feldman stated later in an interview that at that time Michael Werner told Van Vliet he needed to stop playing music if he wanted to be respected as a painter, warning him that otherwise he would only be considered a "musician who paints". In doing so, it was said that he had effectively "succeeded in leaving his past behind". Van Vliet has been described as a modernist, a primitivist, an abstract expressionist, and, "in a sense" an outsider artist. Morgan Falconer of Artforum concurs, mentioning both a "neo-primitivist aesthetic" and further stating that his work is influenced by the CoBrA painters. The resemblance to the CoBrA painters is also recognized by art critic Roberto Ohrt, while others have compared his paintings to the work of Jackson Pollock, Franz Kline, Antonin Artaud, Francis Bacon, Vincent van Gogh and Mark Rothko.

According to Dr. John Lane, director of the San Francisco Museum of Modern Art, in 1997, although Van Vliet's work has associations with mainstream abstract expressionist painting, more importantly he was a self-taught artist and his painting "has that same kind of edge the music has".  Curator David Breuer asserts that in contrast to the busied, bohemian urban lives of the New York abstract expressionists, the rural desert environment Van Vliet was influenced by is a distinctly naturalistic one, making him a distinguished figure in contemporary art, whose work will survive in canon. Van Vliet stated of his own work, "I'm trying to turn myself inside out on the canvas. I'm trying to completely bare what I think at that moment" and "I paint for the simple reason that I have to. I feel a sense of relief after I do." When asked about his artistic influences he stated that there were none. "I just paint like I paint and that's enough influence." He did however state his admiration of Georg Baselitz, the De Stijl artist Piet Mondrian, and Vincent van Gogh; after seeing van Gogh's paintings in person, Van Vliet quoted himself as saying, "The sun disappoints me so."

Exhibits of his paintings from the late 1990s were held in New York in 2009 and 2010. Falconer stated that the most recent exhibitions showed "evidence of a serious, committed artist". It was claimed that he stopped painting in the late 1990s. A 2007 interview with Van Vliet through email by Anthony Haden-Guest, however, showed him to still be active artistically. He exhibited only few of his paintings because he immediately destroyed any that did not satisfy him.

Life in retirement

After his retirement from music, Van Vliet rarely appeared in public. He resided near Trinidad, California, with his wife Janet "Jan" Van Vliet. By the early 1990s, he was using a wheelchair as a result of multiple sclerosis. The severity of his illness was sometimes disputed. Many of his art contractors and friends considered him to be in good health. Other associates such as his longtime drummer and musical director John French and bassist Richard Snyder have stated that they had noticed symptoms consistent with the onset of multiple sclerosis, such as sensitivity to heat, loss of balance, and stiffness of gait, by the late 1970s.

One of Van Vliet's last public appearances was in the 1993 short documentary Some Yo Yo Stuff by filmmaker Anton Corbijn, described as an "observation of his observations". Around 13 minutes and shot entirely in black and white, with appearances by his mother and David Lynch, the film showed a noticeably weakened and dysarthric Van Vliet at his residence in California, reading poetry, and philosophically discussing his life, environment, music and art. In 2000, he appeared on Gary Lucas's album Improve the Shining Hour and Moris Tepper's Moth to Mouth, and spoke on Tepper's 2004 song "Ricochet Man" from the album Head Off. He is credited for naming Tepper's 2010 album A Singer Named Shotgun Throat.

Van Vliet often voiced concern over and support for environmentalist issues and causes, particularly the welfare of animals. He often referred to Earth as "God's Golfball" and this expression can be found on a number of his later albums. In 2003 he was heard on the compilation album Where We Live: Stand for What You Stand On: A Benefit CD for EarthJustice singing a version of "Happy Birthday to You" retitled "Happy Earthday". The track lasts 34 seconds and was recorded over the telephone.

Death
Van Vliet died at a hospital in Arcata, California, on Friday, December 17, 2010. The cause was named as complications from multiple sclerosis. Tom Waits and Kathleen Brennan commented on his death, praising him: "Wondrous, secret ... and profound, he was a diviner of the highest order."

Dweezil Zappa dedicated the song "Willie the Pimp" to Beefheart at the "Zappa Plays Zappa" show at the Beacon Theatre in New York City on the day of his death, while Jeff Bridges exclaimed "Rest in peace, Captain Beefheart!" at the conclusion of the December 18, 2010, episode of NBC's Saturday Night Live.

Relationship with Frank Zappa

Van Vliet met Frank Zappa when they were both teenagers and shared an interest in rhythm and blues and Chicago blues. They collaborated from this early stage with Zappa's scripts for "teenage operettas", such as "Captain Beefheart & the Grunt People", helping to elevate Van Vliet's Captain Beefheart persona. In 1963, the pair recorded a demo at the Pal Recording Studio in Cucamonga as the Soots, seeking support from a major label. Their efforts were unsuccessful, as "Beefheart's Howlin' Wolf vocal style and Zappa's distorted guitar" were "not on the agenda" at the time.

The friendship between Zappa and Van Vliet over the years was sometimes expressed in the form of rivalry as musicians drifted back and forth between their groups. Van Vliet embarked on the 1975 Bongo Fury tour with Zappa and the Mothers, mainly because conflicting contractual obligations made him unable to tour or record independently. Their relationship grew acrimonious on the tour to the point that they refused to talk to one another. Zappa became irritated by Van Vliet, who drew constantly, including while on stage, filling one of his large sketch books with rapidly executed portraits and warped caricatures of Zappa. Musically, Van Vliet's primitive style contrasted sharply with Zappa's compositional discipline and abundant technique. Mothers of Invention drummer Jimmy Carl Black described the situation as "two geniuses" on "ego trips". Estranged for years afterwards, they reconnected at the end of Zappa's life, after his diagnosis with terminal prostate cancer. Their collaborative work appears on the Zappa rarity collections The Lost Episodes (1996) and Mystery Disc (1996). Particularly notable is their song "Muffin Man", included on the Zappa/Beefheart Bongo Fury album, as well as Zappa's compilation album Strictly Commercial (1995). Zappa finished concerts with the song for many years afterwards. Beefheart also provided vocals for "Willie the Pimp" on Zappa's otherwise instrumental album Hot Rats (1969). One track on Trout Mask Replica, "The Blimp (mousetrapreplica)", features Magic Band guitarist Jeff Cotton talking on the telephone to Zappa superimposed onto an unrelated live recording of the Mothers of Invention (the backing track was later released in 1992 as "Charles Ives" on You Can't Do That on Stage Anymore, Vol. 5 ). Van Vliet also played the harmonica on two songs on Zappa albums: "San Ber'dino" (credited as "Bloodshot Rollin' Red") on One Size Fits All (1975) and "Find Her Finer" on Zoot Allures (1976). He is also the vocalist on "The Torture Never Stops (Original Version)" on Zappa's You Can't Do That on Stage Anymore, Vol. 4.

The Magic Band

The Magic Band was the backing band of Captain Beefheart between 1967 and 1982. The rotating lineup featured dozens of performers, many of whom became known by nicknames given to them by Beefheart. Ex-members of the Magic Band formed the short-lived group Mallard in 1974.

Musical style
John Parish described Captain Beefheart's music as a "combination of raw blues and abstract jazz. There was humour in there, but you could tell that it wasn't [intended as] a joke. I felt that there was a depth to what he did that very few other rock artists have managed [to achieve]." A Rolling Stone biography described his work as "a sort of modern chamber music for [a] rock band, since he plans every note and teaches the band their parts by ear." The Encyclopædia Britannica describes Beefheart's songs as conveying "deep distrust of modern civilization, a yearning for ecological balance, and the belief that all animals in the wild are far superior to human beings".

Captain Beefheart's music has been classified as blues rock, art rock, avant-garde, blues, rhythm and blues, experimental rock, free jazz, garage rock, psychedelic, acid rock, avant-pop, avant-rock, progressive rock and proto-punk.

Legacy
Van Vliet has been the subject of at least two documentaries, the BBC's 1997 The Artist Formerly Known as Captain Beefheart narrated by John Peel, and the 2006 independent production Captain Beefheart: Under Review.

According to Peel, "If there has ever been such a thing as a genius in the history of popular music, it's Beefheart ... I heard echoes of his music in some of the records I listened to last week and I'll hear more echoes in records that I listen to this week." His narration added: "A psychedelic shaman who frequently bullied his musicians and sometimes alarmed his fans, Don somehow remained one of rock's great innocents." Mike Barnes referred to him as an "iconic counterculture hero" who, with the Magic Band, "went on to stake out startling new possibilities for rock music". Lester Bangs cited Beefheart as "one of the four or five unqualified geniuses to rise from the hothouses of American music in the Sixties", while John Harris of The Guardian praised the music's "pulses with energy and ideas, the strange way the spluttering instruments meld together".  A Rolling Stone biography said that because his work "breaks so many of rock's conventions at once, Beefheart's music has always been more influential than popular." In this context, it is performed by the classical group, the Meridian Arts Ensemble.

Many artists have cited Van Vliet as an influence, beginning with the Edgar Broughton Band, who covered "Dropout Boogie" as Apache Drop Out (mixed with the Shadows' "Apache") as early as 1970, as did the Kills 32 years later. The Minutemen were fans of Beefheart, and were arguably among the few to effectively synthesize his music with their own, especially in their early output, which featured disjointed guitar and irregular, galloping rhythms. Michael Azerrad describes the Minutemen's early output as "highly caffeinated Captain Beefheart running down James Brown tunes", and notes that Beefheart was the group's "idol". Others who arguably conveyed the same influence around the same time or before include John Cale of the Velvet Underground, Little Feat, Laurie Anderson, the Residents and Henry Cow. Genesis P-Orridge of Throbbing Gristle and Psychic TV, and poet mystic Z'EV, both pioneers of industrial music, cited Van Vliet along with Zappa among their influences. More notable were those emerging during the early days of punk rock, such as the Clash and John Lydon of the Sex Pistols (reportedly to manager Malcolm McLaren's disapproval), later of the post-punk band Public Image Ltd. Frank Discussion of punk rock band The Feederz learned to play guitar from listening to Trout Mask Replica and Lick My Decals Off, Baby.

Cartoonist and writer Matt Groening tells of listening to Trout Mask Replica at the age of 15 and thinking "that it was the worst thing I'd ever heard. I said to myself, they're not even trying! It was just a sloppy cacophony. Then I listened to it a couple more times, because I couldn't believe Frank Zappa could do this to me—and because a double album cost a lot of money. About the third time, I realised they were doing it on purpose; they meant it to sound exactly this way. About the sixth or seventh time, it clicked in, and I thought it was the greatest album I'd ever heard." Groening first saw Beefheart and the Magic Band perform in the front row at the Arlene Schnitzer Concert Hall in the early 1970s. He later declared Trout Mask Replica to be the greatest album ever made. He considered the appeal of the Magic Band as outcasts who were even "too weird for the hippies". Groening served as the curator of the All Tomorrow's Parties festival that reunited the post–Beefheart Magic Band.

Van Vliet's influence on post–punk bands was demonstrated by Magazine's recording of "I Love You You Big Dummy" in 1978 and the tribute album Fast 'n' Bulbous – A Tribute to Captain Beefheart in 1988, featuring the likes of artists such as the Dog Faced Hermans, the Scientists, the Membranes, Simon Fisher Turner, That Petrol Emotion, the Primevals, the Mock Turtles, XTC, and Sonic Youth, who included a cover of Beefheart's "Electricity" which would later be re-released as a bonus track on the deluxe edition of their 1988 album Daydream Nation. Other post-punk bands influenced by Beefheart include Gang of Four, Siouxsie and the Banshees, Pere Ubu, Babe the Blue Ox and Mark E. Smith of the Fall. The Fall covered "Beatle Bones 'N' Smokin' Stones" in their 1993 session for John Peel. Beefheart is considered to have "greatly influenced" new wave artists, such as  David Byrne of Talking Heads, Blondie, Devo, the Bongos, and the B-52s.

Tom Waits' shift in artistic direction, starting with 1983's Swordfishtrombones, was, Waits claims, a result of his wife Kathleen Brennan introducing him to Van Vliet's music. "Once you've heard Beefheart", said Waits, "it's hard to wash him out of your clothes. It stains, like coffee or blood." More recently, Waits has described Beefheart's work as a "glimpse into the future; like curatives, recipes for ancient oils".  Guitarist John Frusciante of the Red Hot Chili Peppers cited Van Vliet as a prominent influence on the band's 1991 album Blood Sugar Sex Magik as well as his debut solo album Niandra Lades and Usually Just a T-Shirt (1994) and stated that during his drug-induced absence, after leaving the Red Hot Chili Peppers, he "would paint and listen to Trout Mask Replica". Black Francis of the Pixies cited Beefheart's The Spotlight Kid as one of the albums he listened to regularly when first writing songs for the band, and Kurt Cobain of Nirvana acknowledged Van Vliet's influence, mentioning him among his notoriously eclectic range.

The White Stripes in 2000 released a 7" tribute single, "Party of Special Things to Do", containing covers of that Beefheart song plus "China Pig" and "Ashtray Heart". The Kills included a cover of "Dropout Boogie" on their debut Black Rooster EP (2002). The Black Keys in 2008 released a free cover of Beefheart's "I'm Glad" from Safe as Milk. The 2002 LCD Soundsystem song "Losing My Edge" has a verse which James Murphy says, "I was there when Captain Beefheart started up his first band".  In 2005, Genus Records produced Mama Kangaroos – Philly Women Sing Captain Beefheart, a 20-track tribute to Captain Beefheart. Beck included "Safe as Milk" and "Ella Guru" in a playlist of songs as part of his website's Planned Obsolescence series of mashups of songs by the musicians that influenced him. Franz Ferdinand cited Beefheart's Doc at the Radar Station as a strong influence on their second LP, You Could Have It So Much Better. Placebo briefly named themselves Ashtray Heart, after the track on Doc at the Radar Station; the band's album Battle for the Sun contains the track, "Ashtray Heart". Joan Osborne covered Beefheart's "(His) Eyes Are a Blue Million Miles", which appears on Early Recordings. She cited Van Vliet as one of her influences.

PJ Harvey and John Parish discussed Beefheart's influence in an interview together. Harvey's first experience of Beefheart's music was as a child. Her parents had all of his albums; listening to them made her "feel ill". Harvey was reintroduced to Beefheart's music by Parish, who lent her a cassette copy of Shiny Beast (Bat Chain Puller) at the age of 16. She cited him as one of her greatest influences since. Ty Segall covered "Drop Out Boogie" on his 2009 album Lemons.

Discography

 Safe as Milk (1967)
 Strictly Personal (1968)
 Trout Mask Replica (1969)
 Lick My Decals Off, Baby (1970)
 Mirror Man (1971)
 The Spotlight Kid (1972)
 Clear Spot (1972)
 Unconditionally Guaranteed (1974)
 Bluejeans & Moonbeams (1974)
 Shiny Beast (Bat Chain Puller) (1978)
 Doc at the Radar Station (1980)
 Ice Cream for Crow (1982)
 Bat Chain Puller (2012, recorded in 1976)

References

See also
 Frank Zappa
 Blues

Bibliography

Further reading
 
 Bamberger, W.C. (1999). Riding Some Kind of Unusual Skull Sleigh: On The Arts Of Don Van Vliet. 
 Beaugrand, Andreas and various (1994). Stand Up to Be Discontinued. (Paperback) .
 Courrier, Kevin (2007). Trout Mask Replica. New York: Continuum. 
 Delville, Michel & Norris, Andrew (2005). Frank Zappa, Captain Beefheart, and the Secret History of Maximalism. Cambridge: Salt Publishing. .
 
 Harkleroad, Bill (1998). Lunar Notes: Zoot Horn Rollo's Captain Beefheart Experience. Interlink Publishing. .
 
 Van Vliet, Don (Captain Beefheart) (1987). Skeleton Breath, Scorpion Blush. (All poems in English, preface in German and English.) Bern-Berlin: Gachnang & Springer. 
 Zappa, Frank & Occhiogrosso, Peter; The Real Frank Zappa Book, Poseidon Press (1989),

External links

 Beefheart.com – The Captain Beefheart Radar Station
 
 [ Captain Beefheart] at AllMusic
 Captain Beefheart at Rolling Stone
 Some Yo Yo Stuff by Anton Corbijn

 
1941 births
2010 deaths
20th-century American painters
American male painters
20th-century American sculptors
20th-century male artists
21st-century American painters
21st-century male artists
21st-century American sculptors
American male sculptors
American surrealist artists
Abstract expressionist artists
Album-cover and concert-poster artists
Alter egos
American environmentalists
American experimental filmmakers
American experimental musicians
American blues singers
American blues harmonica players
American blues saxophonists
American rhythm and blues singers
Art rock musicians
Free jazz saxophonists
American harmonica players
American male poets
American male singers
American multi-instrumentalists
American people of Dutch descent
American rock saxophonists
American male saxophonists
American rock singers
Antelope Valley High School alumni
Avant-garde singers
Bass clarinetists
Blues rock musicians
Buddah Records artists
Neurological disease deaths in California
Deaths from multiple sclerosis
Experimental rock musicians
Frank Zappa
Liberty Records artists
Mercury Records artists
Musical groups disestablished in 1982
Musical groups established in 1965
Musicians from Glendale, California
Painters from California
People from Arcata, California
People from Lancaster, California
Progressive rock musicians
Protopunk musicians
Psychedelic musicians
Reprise Records artists
Songwriters from California
Blue Thumb Records artists
Virgin Records artists
Warner Records artists
Writers from Glendale, California
People from Trinidad, California
Freak scene
Sculptors from California
Freak scene musicians
Sub Rosa Records artists
Third Man Records artists
The Magic Band members
Nicknames
Nicknames in music
American oboists